Anton Gămurari (15 August 1950 – 17 March 2021) was a Moldovan general.

Biography 
During the Transnistria War, Lieutenant-Colonel Anton Gămurari commanded a special-purpose police brigade that fought with Transnistrian paramilitary groups. On December 13, 1991, a Transnistrian attack on the Dubasari Police Station took place, and as a result, the special purpose police brigade spent the night in Dubasari at the hydroelectric plant and a fight ensued, which resulted in four Moldovan police officers being killed. Negotiations followed, after which the Transnistrian forces withdrew. In March 1992, the situation became tenser, and the Special Brigade crossed the Dniester on the ice at Dubasari and provided assistance to the Dubasari Police Station and the population of the villages of Cocieri and Corjova. Anton Gămurari was promoted by President Mircea Snegur to the rank of major general of police.

In November 1997, General Gămurari was appointed Director-General of the Department of Civil Protection and Exceptional Situations. A report of the Court of Accounts considered its activity to be unsatisfactory in terms of the administration of public financial means, resulting in the admission of overspending of budgetary means in enormous proportions. He was released from the position of general manager on July 29, 1999, being succeeded by General Constantin Antoci.

Major General of Police Anton Gămurari participated in the training of all special troops of the Ministry of Interior, starting with the first company created within the Patrol and Sentinel Battalion, then the former OMON. On December 5, 1991, by a government decision, the "Fulger" (In English: "Lightning")  Special Purpose Police Brigade was formed.

After joining the reserve, General Anton Gămurari served as vice president of the National Union of War Veterans for Independence (UNVRI).

Anton Gămurari died on 17 March 2021, at the age of 70, from COVID-19.

References

1950 births
2021 deaths
People from Chișinău
Moldovan generals
Deaths from the COVID-19 pandemic in Moldova